Run&Gun (stylized as RUN&GUN) is a Japanese boy band and performance troupe associated with Yoshimoto Kogyo. The group was formed in 2001 by Antinos Records. The members consist of Yuya Miyashita, Kosuke Yonehara, and Akira Nagata; Ryuji Kamiyama left the group in 2014.

Run&Gun debuted in 2001 with the song "Lay-Up!" and were initially produced by Daisuke Asakura before moving to Epic Records Japan in 2002. Throughout their career, Run&Gun also engaged in theater projects, including their own self-produced stage plays and Air Gear. In 2008, they announced they were putting their musical releases on hiatus and planned to focus on their acting projects instead.

History

2001–2006: Debut and early years

Miyashita, Kamiyama, Yonehara, and Nagata were part of D.A.N.K. (Daisuke Asakura New Kids), a performance troupe produced by Daisuke Asakura. In 2001, they were selected as members for Run&Gun through an audition television program called Study Park!! On July 4, 2001, they debuted with the song "Lay-Up!", which was used as an opening theme song for Study Park!! Their second single, "Ready Go!" was released on August 29, 2001 as the theme song to a Lotte commercial. Their third single, "Twinkle Starlight", was released on December 5, 2001, as the ending theme song to the television series Danmaru! Heroes.

Following the release of "Peace Out Iza, Saraba" on March 6, 2002, Run&Gun was transferred to Epic Records Japan and parted ways with Asakura. They released their fifth single, "Loop", on July 10, 2002 as the ending theme to Show Up Nighter. Afterwards, their sixth single, "Wishing On", was released on November 20, 2002. Their seventh single, "Shootin' to My Eyes", was released on February 19, 2003. They released the song "Mi-ra-i" on May 21, 2003 as the first ending theme song to Sonic X. Following its release, Run&Gun released their first studio album, Face, on July 16, 2003. In the summer of 2003, Run&Gun held their first tour titled Blue Journey.

In 2004, Run&Gun departed from Epic Records Japan and signed onto Yoshimoto Kogyo, where they released their ninth single, "Believe", on August 18, 2004. On January 19, 2005, they released "Blackjack" as the ending theme to Jack Sports. On February 23, 2005, they released their extended play, Hateshinai Tabi no Naka de... On June 21, 2006, they released their second studio album, Re:ing.

2007–present: Focus on acting

After Re:ing was released, Run&Gun began branching out and focusing on other projects. In 2007, Kamiyama and Yonehara published a novel together titled Flying Melon. Run&Gun also starred as Team Bacchus in the stage play adaptation of Air Gear, an original team made for the musical. In January 2008, Run&Gun held their first group-produced stage play, Blue Sheets, followed up with another stage play titled YooSoRo!: Nihon o Kaeta Yatsura o Kaeta Yatsura. Later in 2008, Run&Gun announced a hiatus on their musical releases, stating that they planned to focus on acting projects within and outside of the group.

In February 2009, Kamiyama and Yonehara were cast in the all-male stage adaptation of Fruits Basket. In 2010, Run&Gun ran their third stage play, Bokura no Chikara de Sekai ga Ato Nankai Sukueta ka. In April 2010, Run&Gun reprised their roles as Team Bacchus in the Air Gear stage play. In 2014, Kamiyama left the group to pursue acting full-time.

Discography

Studio albums

Extended plays

Singles

Video albums

References

External links
 

Japanese boy bands
Japanese pop music groups
Musical groups established in 2001
Singing talent show winners